Konstantin Pavlovich Kvashnin (27 December 1898 – 2 November 1982) was a Soviet Russian football player and manager who managed FC Dynamo Moscow to a championship in the first ever Soviet Top League competition in 1936.

Honours as a manager
 Soviet Top League champion: 1936 (spring), 1938.
 Soviet Top League runner-up: 1936 (autumn), 1937.
 Soviet Top League bronze: 1948.
 Soviet Cup winner: 1938, 1949.

External links
 

1898 births
Footballers from Moscow
1982 deaths
Russian footballers
Soviet footballers
Soviet Top League players
FC Spartak Moscow players
FC Dynamo Moscow players
Soviet football managers
FC Dynamo Moscow managers
FC Spartak Moscow managers
FC Torpedo Moscow managers
FC Shakhtar Donetsk managers
Association football midfielders